Hainan Ring may refer to several transportation features in the Chinese province of Hainan:
 G98 Hainan Island Ring Expressway
 Hainan Eastern Ring High-Speed Railway
 Hainan Western Ring Railway
 Hainan Western Ring High-Speed Railway